Battlestar and similar may refer to:

Battle star, an award issued to U.S. Navy ships for participation in battles.
Battlestar (comics), a superhero in the Marvel Comics universe
Battlestars (game show), an American game show that aired on two separate runs on NBC during the early 1980s
"Battlestar", a song by Five off their 1999 album Invincible

See also
 Military Star, Irish decoration
Battlestar Galactica (disambiguation) for uses of Battlestar in science fiction and video games
Warstar (disambiguation)
Battle (disambiguation)
Star (disambiguation)